Bill Stanley may refer to:
 Bill Stanley (American football), American football coach
 Bill Stanley (politician) (born 1967), American politician

See also  
 William Stanley (disambiguation)